Bilney is a surname. Notable people with the surname include: 

Gordon Bilney (1939–2012), Australian politician
Ray Bilney (born 1945), Australian cyclist
Thomas Bilney (c.1495–1531), English Christian martyr

Other
Bilney railway station, former station in Norfolk, England